Lloyd Spiegel (born 1979) is an Australian guitarist, songwriter and singer. He began performing at age of 10 and has produced ten albums and collaborated on many other recordings both as artist and producer.

Spiegel is based in Melbourne, Australia, and has toured throughout Canada, Europe, New Zealand, US and Japan.

Career
Spiegel took an interest in the blues when he was six years old and found an album by Sonny Terry Brownie McGhee in his father's record collection. His father took him to shows by Dutch Tilders and Geoff Achison, and in about two years was playing in blues club bands. He was invited to the US by Brownie McGhee at age 16.

Spiegel won his first talent competition at the age of 10 and was playing regular gigs in Melbourne, Australia. At the age of 13 he formed his own band, Midnight Special, which he fronted from 1993 to 1998, and at 15 he recorded and produced his first CD. He has worked as a solo performer since 1996 performing at festivals and theatre venues all around the world. Spiegel is the face of major Australian guitar brand Cole Clark Guitars.

Discography

Albums

Awards and nominations

Australian Blues Awards
2005 Australian Blues Award;
 Band of the year

2015 Australian Blues Awards;
 Artist of the year
 Song of the year
 Producer of the year
 Album of the year

2017 Australian Blues Awards;
 Song of the year 
 Album of the year

2019 Australian Blues Awards;
 Artist of the year
 Song of the year
 Producer of the year
 Album of the year

2020 Australian Blues Awards;
 Artist of the year
 Album of the year
 Producer of the year

Music Victoria Awards
The Music Victoria Awards are an annual awards night celebrating Victorian music. They commenced in 2006.

! 
|-
| Music Victoria Awards of 2017
| This Time Tomorrow
| Best Blues Album
| 
|rowspan="3"| 
|-
| Music Victoria Awards of 2018
| Backroads
| Best Blues Album
| 
|-
| Music Victoria Awards of 2020
| Cut and Run
| Best Blues Album
| 
|-

VICTAS Blues Awards
2004 VICTAS Blues Awards;
 Male artist of the year
 Song of the year
 Band of the year

2010 VICTAS Blues Awards;
 Male artist of the year
 Song of the year
 Producer of the year

2015 VICTAS Blues Awards;
 Album of the year
 Solo artist of the year
 Song of the year
 Best self produced album

2017 VICTAS Blues Awards
 Album of the year
 Song of the year
 Solo artist of the year

2018 VICTAS Blues Awards;
 Album of the year
 Artist of the year
 Song of the year

2019 VICTAS Blues Awards;
 Solo artist of the year
 Artist of the year

References

1979 births
Living people
Australian blues guitarists
Place of birth missing (living people)
Australian male guitarists
20th-century Australian musicians
20th-century guitarists
21st-century Australian singers
21st-century guitarists
20th-century Australian male musicians
21st-century Australian male singers